Piero Buscaroli (21 August 1930 – 15 February 2016) was an Italian musicologist, journalist and essayist.

Life
Born in Imola, the son of a Latinist,  Buscaroli studied organ, harmony and counterpoint at the Conservatorio Giovanni Battista Martini, and later he graduated in Law with a thesis about the Italian legal history.

From 1955 to 1977, Buscaroli collaborated with the magazine Il Borghese, writing  articles of music criticism, international politics  and  modern  history and often using the pseudonym "Hans Sachs". From 1972 to 1975 he was director of the newspaper Roma, and in 1979 he began a long collaboration with the newspaper Il Giornale directed by Indro Montanelli, where he  used the pseudonym Piero Santerno for his not-music-related articles.

Buscaroli wrote several books on the history of music, notably Bach (1985), which got over twenty editions, Beethoven (2004), a 1350 pages book which was the result of five years of continuous study, and La morte di Mozart ("The death of Mozart", 1996), in which he suggested that Mozart's Requiem was not left unfinished because of the death of its author, but because of a deliberate choice of Mozart himself, due to reluctance on his part to fulfill the contractual clause, imposed on him by the client, which prevented him to claim authorship of his work.

References

Sources

1930 births
2016 deaths
Conservatorio Giovanni Battista Martini alumni
People from Imola
University of Bologna alumni
Italian musicologists
20th-century Italian non-fiction writers
20th-century Italian male writers
Italian non-fiction writers
Italian male non-fiction writers